Lasiothyris perlochra is a species of moth of the family Tortricidae. It is found in Minas Gerais, Brazil.

The wingspan is about 10.5 mm. The ground colour of the forewings is pearl creamy with glossy diffuse lines along the markings and pale ochreous suffusions. The hindwings are creamy brownish.

References

Moths described in 2002
Cochylini